Winds Fairground is an album by the Japanese band Soul Flower Union.  The album was recorded in Ireland, and has the heaviest Celtic music influence of all their albums.  However, the influence of traditional Japanese music, Okinawan music and swing jazz also remains heavy.

Track listing

External links

1999 albums